Carnivore is an American crossover thrash metal band from Brooklyn, New York City. It was founded by singer and bassist Peter Steele out of the breakup of the Brooklyn metal group Fallout in 1983.

History 
Carnivore released their self-titled debut album Carnivore in November 1985. For this album, the band spelled their names in what they thought were "exotic" ways, Petrus T. Steele and Louie Beateaux. The band often dressed as warriors in torn clothing and spikes attached to hockey gear during their live shows at this period. Keith Alexander left the band in 1986 because he was not interested in the new crossover direction of the band, and was replaced by Marc Piovanetti, who later joined Crumbsuckers. In September 1987, they released their second album, Retaliation. Soon after their second album was released, the band broke up and Peter Steele formed a new band called Repulsion, which would later be renamed Type O Negative. According to the sleeve notes of the "Top Shelf Edition" of their second album, the first Type O Negative album, Slow Deep and Hard was composed largely from material originally written for Carnivore. Peter Steele and Marc Piovanetti would not appear together on a release again until the compilation Songs of the Witchblade: A Soundtrack to the Comic Book in 1998.

Reformation and second break-up 
Despite being disbanded for many years, the band was reactivated on several occasions, including several reunion shows in the mid 1990s with the Retaliation lineup, and an appearance at the 1996 Milwaukee Metalfest, plus several shows from 2006 to 2007 with a new four-piece lineup. The new lineup of the band performed at the Wacken Open Air in 2006.

Peter Steele died April 14, 2010, thus ending the reunion.

Carnivore A.D. 

In August 2017, it was announced that Carnivore would officially be reformed as Carnivore A.D., featuring original drummer Louie Beato and guitarist Marc Piovanetti along with secondary drummer Joe Branciforte sharing drum duties and also introducing new member Baron Misuraca as the bassist/vocalist.

After a live performance at the 2017 Black N Blue Bowl pre-party in May, Piovanetti announced that the group would reform out of great respect to Peter Steele's legacy while simultaneously distinguishing themselves from past incarnations of the band. They played their first show with Misuraca on October 31 at Bowery Electric in New York City dubbed "A Halloween SteeleTacular". The band then made their live festival debut at the 2018 edition of Hellfest.

Musical style 

The first Carnivore album was heavily influenced by the contemporary New York hardcore scene. It also drew inspiration from Black Sabbath and early Judas Priest, whereas the second album had significant crossover influences. The 'post-apocalyptic' theme that dominated the first album and was carried onto parts of the second album was apparently inspired by a dream Pete Steele had and which became the basis for the lyrics of "Predator", the first song from the original album. The lyrical theme was then expanded on to describe human society (or the lack of one) between imaginary World Wars 3, 4, and possibly 5 (as referenced in the song "World Wars 3 & 4"). Other lyrical themes included nihilism, anti-religious sentiment, cynicism, and explicit-but-tongue-in-cheek depictions of gore and despair. Song titles such as "Jesus Hitler", "Race War", "Thermonuclear Warrior", and "God Is Dead" reflect these themes.

Band members 
Current members
 Louie Beato - drums (1982-1990, 1994-1996, 2017-present)
 Marc Piovanetti - guitar (1986-1990, 1994-1996, 2017-present)
 Baron Misuraca - lead vocals, bass guitar (2017-present)
 Joe Branciforte - drums (2017-present)

Former members
 Peter Steele − lead vocals, bass guitar (1982–1990, 1994–1996, 2006–2010; died 2010)
 Keith Alexander – guitar (1982–1986; died 2005)
 Stan Pillis − guitar (1982–1983)
 Paul Bento − guitar (2006–2010)
 Steve Tobin − drums (2006–2010)
 Joey Z. − guitar (2006–2010)

Timeline

Discography

Studio albums 
 Carnivore (1985)
 Retaliation (1987)

Compilation albums 
 Retaliation / Carnivore (1991)

Demo albums 
 Demo '84 (1984)
 U.S.A. for U.S.A. (1986)

Singles 
 "Carnivore" (1984)
 "Predator" (1985)

References

External links 

Official website (archived)
 
 

1983 establishments in New York City
American thrash metal musical groups
American speed metal musical groups
Crossover thrash groups
Heavy metal musical groups from New York (state)
Musical groups from Brooklyn
Musical groups established in 1983
Musical groups disestablished in 1987
Musical groups reestablished in 1994
Musical groups disestablished in 1996
Musical groups reestablished in 2006
Musical groups disestablished in 2010
Musical groups reestablished in 2017
Roadrunner Records artists